The Louisiana Eagle was a long distance night train operated by the Texas and Pacific Railway that from New Orleans to Fort Worth, Texas. The route was distinct in contrast to other routes running west from New Orleans to major Texas cities. It ran northwest-ward from New Orleans to northwest Louisiana and to the major North Texas cities of Dallas and Fort Worth with continuing service to El Paso on the Missouri Pacific's Texas Eagle, whereas other east-west trains from New Orleans into Texas went to the south, to Houston and San Antonio.

The train was #21 westbound, #22 eastbound. It had a daytime counterpart in the Louisiana Daylight (#27, westbound, 28, eastbound). The Missouri Pacific ran successor night and day trains to the Louisiana Eagle and the Louisiana Daylight as late as 1968. By 1969, all that was left was the successor night train, which was shortened to a Marshall, Texas to New Orleans route. By 1970, passenger service was completely discontinued.

Major stops served
New Orleans, LA (Union Passenger Terminal)
Addis (for Baton Rouge)
Alexandria 
Shreveport (T&P station)
Marshall, TX
Longview (T&P station)
Dallas (Union Station)
Fort Worth (T&P Station)
via the MP's Texas Eagle:
Abilene
Midland
Odessa
El Paso (Union Depot)

Notes

Named passenger trains of the United States
Passenger rail transportation in Louisiana
Passenger rail transportation in Texas
Passenger trains of the Texas and Pacific Railway
Railway services introduced in 1949
1963 disestablishments
Transportation in New Orleans
Night trains of the United States
Railway services discontinued in 1963